This is a complete list of botanical gardens in Hungary.

Alcsútdoboz arboretum
Bábolna arboretum
Badacsonytomaj, Folly arboretum
Balatongyörök, Büdöskút arboretum
Bárdudvarnok, Kaposdada arboretum
Buda arboretum
Budakeszi arboretum
Budapest Budapest Zoo & Botanical Garden
Budapest Füvészkert
Budapest, Soroksár arboretum
Cserszegtomaj arboretum
Csurgónagymarton, Ágneslak Arboretum
Debrecen, Diószegi Sámuel Botanical Garden
Erdőtelek arboretum
Gödöllő arboretum
Hosszúhetény, Püspökszentlászló: arboretum of the episcopal castle
Kám, Jel Arboretum (the largest in Hungary, 74 hectares)
Kiscsehi, Budafapuszta arboretum
Kőszeg, Chernel-kert Arboretum
Lábatlan-Piszke, Gerenday arboretum
Orosháza, Rágyánszki Arboretum
Pákozd, Pákozd-sukoró Arboretum
Pannonhalma arboretum
Püspökladány arboretum
Sárvár arboretum
Sopron Egyetemi Botanikus Kert / Élő növénygyűjtemény
Szarvas, Pepi-kert arboretum
Szeleste arboretum
Szombathely, Kámon Arboretum
Tata-Agostyán arboretum
Tiszaigar arboretum
Tiszakürt arboretum
Tiszalök arboretum
Vácrátót Botanical Garden
Zalaegerszeg, Csács Arboretum
Zirc arboretum

See also
List of botanical gardens
Debrecen, Diószegi Sámuel Botanical Garden

References

 
Botanical gardens
Hungary
Botanical gardens